Sterndale may refer to:

People

 Robert Armitage Sterndale (1839–1902), British naturalist and statesman
 Joan Sterndale-Bennett (1914–1996), British stage and film actress
 Sir William Sterndale Bennett (1816–1875), English composer
 William Pickford, 1st Baron Sterndale (1848–1923), British lawyer and judge
 Dr Leon Sterndale, a fictional character in The Adventure of the Devil's Foot, a Sherlock Holmes story by Sir Arthur Conan Doyle

Places

 Earl Sterndale, a village in Derbyshire, England
 King Sterndale, a village in Derbyshire, England